The 1974–75 season was Kilmarnock’s 73rd in Scottish League Competitions. They finished 12th and failed to qualify for the inaugural 10 team Scottish Premier League.

Scottish First Division

Scottish League Cup

Group stage

Group 6 final table

Knockout stage

Scottish Cup

Drybrough Cup

See also
List of Kilmarnock F.C. seasons

References

External links
https://www.fitbastats.com/kilmarnock/team_results_season.php

Kilmarnock F.C. seasons